The word roboteer refers to those with interests or careers in robotics. It dates back to the 1930s and is also used in 'Future Shock' (1970).

The term roboteer was used by Barbara Krasnov for a story on Deb Huglin, owner of the Robotorium, Inc., in New York City in the early 1980s. Huglin was a lightweight-robotics applications consultant, sculptor, and repatriation archeologist. Huglin worked with Jim Henson on the design and uses of the robotic mit controller for his experimental television series "Fraggle Rock".  Huglin died in a fall in the wilderness near Hemet, California in 2008.

See also
Roboticist

References

External links
Debbie the Roboteer on IMDB.

Robotics